The 2022–23 UC Santa Barbara Gauchos men's basketball team represented the University of California, Santa Barbara in the 2022–23 NCAA Division I men's basketball season. The Gauchos, led by sixth-year head coach Joe Pasternack, played their home games at The Thunderdome in Santa Barbara, California as members of the Big West Conference. They finished the season 27–7, 15–5 in Big West Play to tie as regular season champions. They defeated Cal Poly, UC Riverside, and Cal State Fullerton to be champions of the Big West tournament. They received the Big West’s automatic bid to the NCAA tournament where they lost in the first round to Baylor.

Previous season
The Gauchos finished the 2021–22 season 17–11, 8–5 in Big West play to finish in fifth place. They defeated UC Irvine in the quarterfinals of the Big West tournament before losing to Long Beach State in the semifinals.

Roster

Schedule and results 

|-
!colspan=12 style=| Non-conference regular season

|-
!colspan=9 style=| Big West regular season

|-
!colspan=12 style=| Big West tournament

|-
!colspan=12 style=}| NCAA tournament

Source

References

UC Santa Barbara Gauchos men's basketball seasons
UC Santa Barbara Gauchos
UC Santa Barbara Gauchos men's basketball
UC Santa Barbara Gauchos men's basketball
UC Santa Barbara